Yoneyama is a Japanese surname. Notable people with the surname include:

, Japanese footballer
, Japanese footballer
, Japanese ice hockey player
, Japanese swimmer
, Japanese professional wrestler
, Japanese volleyball player
, Japanese mathematician
, Japanese businessman
, Japanese politician
, better known as Muhammad Yone, Japanese professional wrestler
, Japanese footballer
, Japanese golfer
, Japanese volleyball player

See also
Yoneyama Station, a railway station in Kashiwazaki, Niigata Prefecture, Japan
Yonex, formerly known as Yoneyama Company

Japanese-language surnames